The Billboard Hot R&B/Hip-Hop Songs chart ranks the best-performing singles in that category in the United States. The first number one song of the year was claimed by Beyoncé with "Single Ladies (Put a Ring on It)". The song remained at the peak position in 2009 for a further six consecutive weeks, and it ranked as the number six song on Billboards Hot R&B/Hip-Hop Songs year-end list. "Single Ladies (Put a Ring on It)" was replaced by Jamie Foxx's song "Blame It", featuring T-Pain, after it had spent twelve consecutive weeks atop the chart throughout late 2008 and early 2009. "Blame It" topped the chart for fourteen consecutive weeks, and it ranked as the number one song on Billboards Hot R&B/Hip-Hop Songs year-end list.

Jeremih's "Birthday Sex" topped the chart for two consecutive weeks. "Birthday Sex" ranked as the number twenty song on the Hot R&B/Hip-Hop Songs year end list. This was followed by Keri Hilson's song "Knock You Down", featuring Kanye West and Ne-Yo, which also peaked at number one for two consecutive weeks. "Knock You Down" ranked as the number eleven song on the Hot R&B/Hip-Hop Songs year end list. Drake's song "Best I Ever Had" spent seven weeks atop the chart. "Best I Ever Had" ranked at number four on the Hot R&B/Hip-Hop Songs year end list. He was succeeded by Maxwell's song "Pretty Wings", which spent fourteen consecutive weeks atop the chart. "Pretty Wings" ranked at number two on the Hot R&B/Hip-Hop Songs year end list. Jay-Z's collaboration featuring Alicia Keys, "Empire State of Mind", spent three weeks at number one. "Papers" by Usher peaked at number one for two weeks. The last song to peak at number one in 2009 was Trey Songz's song "I Invented Sex" featuring Drake.

List

See also
2009 in music
List of number-one rhythm and blues hits (United States)

References

2009
United States RandB Singles
Number-one RandB singles